The fourth season of the American television series Señora Acero also known as Señora Acero: La Coyote, written by Indira Páez based on an original story by Roberto Stopello, revolves around Vicenta Acero, a coyote woman who fights against the Mexican government and the United States Border Patrol for helping to cross immigrants on the border and make them fulfill their American dream. She, her brother and her boyfriend managed to unmask the Mexican government and continues to work in the business of helping immigrants cross the border. 

The season is starred Carolina Miranda as Vicenta Acero, Luis Ernesto Franco as Daniel Philips, Ana Lucía Domínguez as La Tuti, Diego Cadavid as Señor Romero, and Jorge Zárate as El Indio Amaro, and the special participation of Gaby Espino as Indira Cárdenas.

The fourth season began airing on 6 November 2017, on Telemundo, and concluded on 20 February 2018.

The season has as its main axis, illegal immigration, the inclusion of Julián Romero, a new enemy of Los Acero, and the life of Indira Cárdenas as a mother.

Plot 
Vicenta Acero (Carolina Miranda) and Daniel Phillips (Luis Ernesto Franco) swore an eternal love after ending Chucho Casáres (Sergio Goyri) in the middle of the desert, but they know that destiny is not on their side. Both the government of Mexico and the United States are against the Acero family, since they are responsible for the death of the governor of Chihuahua, Chucho Casáres. Obliged to go underground, Vicenta and Daniel decide to move to Nuevo Laredo, Tamaulipas. Now they have more enemies than ever. Indira Cárdenas (Gaby Espino), who she is now the head of the Department of Homeland Security and Border Patrol of Texas, continues to be the biggest hurdle for Vicenta and Daniel. El Indio Amaro (Jorge Zárate), without money and power, blackmails Indira to allow him to pass drugs across the border and rebuild his cartel. But Vicenta and Daniel intercept the cargo, leaving El Indio ruined and vowing to take revenge on them. As if that were not enough, a new enemy appears, the Colombian known as Mr. Romero. Mr. Romero is in fact Julián Montero (Diego Cadavid), son of Briceida Montero and nephew of Rodrigo Montero, and has come to Mexico to avenge the death of his family. Mr. Romero joins forces with all the enemies of Los Acero to get what he wants, forming a team first with El Indio Amaro and then with Tuti. La Tuti (Ana Lucía Domínguez), anxious for revenge against El Indio, has been attracting her clients to her own organization, "The Havana Cartel", also known as "The Mamacitas Cartel", led by a clan of beautiful women.

Salvador Acero (Michel Duval) is still in love with his wife, Rosario (Oka Giner), and continues to work with Vicenta and Daniel in the business of helping immigrants cross the border. El Gallo (Óscar Priego), aware of the corrupt plans in which the Mexican President (Mario Loría), Chucho's boss has been implicated, blackmails him into leaving his family in peace. And then he decides to launch his own political career, becoming the mayor of Nuevo Laredo. Now with power, El Gallo can now manipulate the chains of power for the benefit of the Acero family. For his part Romero becomes obsessed with Vicenta, to the point of send it her to kidnap. El Gallo recruits Daniel and Salvador on a rescue mission that causes many deaths. Once again, the blood and revenge follow Vicenta Acero, who, despite her pain, will continue to do justice along the border as La Coyote.

Cast and characters

Main characters 
 Carolina Miranda as Vicenta Acero / La Coyote, she is a coyote that is dedicated to crossing migrants on the border, half-sister of Salvador Acero and girlfriend of Daniel Phillips. After assassinating Chucho Casáres, Vicenta and her family wanted by the corrupted Mexican government because of the death of Chucho Casáres.
 Luis Ernesto Franco as Daniel Phillips, he is an immigration police officer, boyfriend of Vicenta and son of Victoria Phillips. He works with Los Aceros crossing immigrants on the border. After helping Indira to rescue her son, his charges with justice are lifted and he returns to Department of National Security after of Indira's dimismissal by the death of Officer Sánchez.
 Ana Lucía Domínguez as Marta Mónica Villalobos / La Tuti, after having inherited all of Carlos Delgado's money, La Tuti teamed up with El Roscas to destroy El Indio Amaro due to wanting her revenge for him making her believe her son Álvaro was dead. She, Marcelo, and El Roscas create the de la Habana cartel.
 Diego Cadavid as Julián Montero, better known as Señor Romero or Julián Romero, is a Colombian drug lord and leader of the Cali cartel, later new leader of the Tijuana cartel who turns out is the son of Briceida Montero and Teca Martínez. While arriving in Mexico to avenge the death of his mother, his biological father, his half-brother and family, he is poses as a human rights lawyer who begins to form an obsession and vendetta over Vicenta in order to destroy the Acero-Quintanilla clan.
 Jorge Zárate as El Indio Amaro, is the main enemy of Los Aceros. With the help of Indira and the president of Mexico, he raises the Tijuana cartel again. Finally he is executed and mortally crashed with a rock by Gallo Quintanilla and the Acero brothers.
 Gaby Espino as Índira Cárdenas, she is the corrupted head of the Department of National Security. She is Nicolás's mother and Jorge's ex-wife. She works for El Indio Amaro and fights to have custody of his son and later dismissed from her position for the murder of Officer Arturo Sánchez.

Recurring characters 

 Michel Duval as Salvador Acero, he is the half-brother of Vicenta, and Rosario's boyfriend. Together with his sister they cross migrants on the border of Mexico.
 Mauricio Henao as José Ángel Godoy, After Salvador castrated him and was left dead. José Ángel is rescued by El Indio Amaro and Mario Casas and is forced to work for them. Finally he dies in the explosion in the cabin caused by himself.
 Alberto Agnesi as Marcelo Dóriga. After Aracely's death, Marcelo prevents Mario from keeping custody of Elizabeth. Marcelo joins forces with La Tuti and El Rosca and create the de la Habana cartel and he die together with Mario during their final confrontation.
 Rodrigo Guirao as Mario Casas, is a pharmacist and scientific engineer, who tries to destroy the life of Marcelo, father of Elizabeth and boyfriend of Andrea. In this season it is revealed that Mario suffers from obsession with Aracely, even after her death and he die together with Marcelo during their final confrontation.
 Óscar Priego as Erick Quintanilla / El Gallo,  after fleeing for a long time from the police and the Mexican government, he manages to find evidence to incriminate the president of Mexico and becomes the Municipal President of Matamoros.
 Jonathan Islas as Tecolote, he is a cold-blooded murderer who starts working for El Indio Amaro on the recommendation of Indira.
 Aurora Gil as Josefina Aguilar, she is the only survivor of the surname Aguilar, wife of Erick and mother of Belinda, daughter that he had with Larry.
 Oka Giner as Rosario Franco, she is Salvador's girlfriend, and Aida's sister.
 Shalim Ortiz as Arturo Sánchez, he is a migration officer who helps Daniel and Vicenta in everything she can, and tries to find incriminating evidence against Indira Cárdenas, but dies getting multiple shots by El Tecolote from behind during a confrontation with El Indio.
 Alberto Casanova as Jorge Araujo, he is the ex-husband of Indira and father of Nicolás.
 Nubia Martí as Victoria Phillips, is the mother of Daniel, who suffers from Alzheimer's.
 María José Magán as Andrea Dóriga, is the girlfriend of Mario and daughter of Marcelo and later commits suicide.
 León Peraza as Domingo, he is Mario's accomplice in all his criminal acts and later dies in the explosion caused by Mario Casas.
 Mario Loría as Heriberto Roca, he is the former corrupted president of Mexico, later arrested along with Triple R and dismissed from his position for acts of corruption, connections, torture and business with the Tijuana Cartel, with the murdered corrupted governor of Chihuahua Chucho Casares and the murder of corrupted former commander of PGE Eladio Puertas and later dies poisoned by Julian Romero in the Federal prison.
 Haydeé Navarra as Ximena Ladrón de Guevara, is the ex-wife of Marcelo, mother of Andrea and grandmother of Alvaro II.
 Felipe Betancourt as Azuceno, is one of the security men of Julián.
 Alicia Jaziz as Carmen Placiencia, she is an immigrant, who Indira kidnaps to work with El Indio, and befriends José Ángel and Nicolás. However, as the series progresses, her and José Angel begin to have a mutual attraction towards each other. Later dies after of trying to escape with Pepito.
 Jessica Segura as Aída Franco, sister of Rosario.
 Benjamín Rivero as Raúl Ricardo Rondón / Triple R, is a political adviser for El Gallo later betrays him, later arrested along with corrupted president and later executed by Julian's men.
 Mario Escalante as Pancho Panteón, is one of the security men of Los Acero and later dies in the explosión by Mario.
 Lucía Silva as Débora, mother of Miguel Quintanilla, lover of El Gallo and later killed by a fatal shot by El Roscas by Julian's order.
 Katia del Pino as Lili Valdés, is a prostitute, who joins the La Tuti cartel. Later killed by a fatal shot by El Tecolote by the Indio's order.
 Eduardo Amer as Bebote, is one of the security men of Los Acero.
 Roberto Wohlmuth as El Roscas, After betraying El Indio Amaro, which costed him his wife. He starts working for La Tuti and Julian Romero. Responsible for the murder of Deborah and finally killed by Salvador Acero.
 Lourdes Reyes as Cayetana Roca, is the former wife of the deceased corrupted president of Mexico Heriberto Roca.
 Fermín Martínez as Ramiro Núñez "El Jaibo", is a prisoner who helps Salvador return to the world of money laundering and later killed by Julian's men
 Nikolás Caballero as Nicolás, son of Indira and Jorge. He ends up being kidnapped by El Indio, at first taken as a hostage. Then fakes Nikolás’ murder, by psychologically breaking him into becoming a “second son” and heir to the Cartel of Tijuana, for El Indio.
 Jesús Castro as Ernesto Aristimuño, he is a former journalist, who helps Los Acero destroy the president.
 Tomás Rojas as Eladio Puertas, former corrupted commander of the PGE. He was arrested after he was order to take Vicenta to an unknown location to kill her and dismissed from his position and executed by Corrupted President's order. 
 Martijn Kuiper as Gregory Jones, is the owner of the farm in Falfurrias, Texas, where Rosario's sister lives and works. However, Gregory and Aida, secretly have an affair together.
 Javier Escobar as Officer Sergio Mendoza, After Eladio Puertas was arrested and was ordered to be executed, the corrupted president named him commander of the PGE. Who helps the Acero brothers in the rebellion to incriminating evidence against of the president of the republic Heriberto Roca.
 Sandra Quiróz as Laura Jones, Gregory's wife.
 Paty Pacheco as Yanisei Vega, is a prostitute, who joins the La Tuti cartel.
 María Fernanda Quiroz as Frida Cuevas, she is a lawyer and ex girlfriend of Daniel and later arrested for incriminating evidence against Gregory without consent and also for attempting to evade justice.
 Gibrán Cantú as Fiambré, he is one of Romero's security men.
 Yasmary Delgado as Lázara, better known as La Glu Glu, she is a transgender woman who works for La Tuti.

Episodes

Production

Development 
On May 16, 2017 it was announced that the series would be renewed for a fourth season for the 2017-2018 television season. The production of the fourth season began on May 31, 2017 in Mexico, and was officially confirmed on July 6, 2017, created by Roberto Stopello and written by Indira Páez. It is an original production of Telemundo Studios, made by Argos Comunicación, directed by Miguel Varoni and Felipe Aguilar under the executive production of Mariana Iskandarani.

Filming 
The series has locations such as Nuevo Laredo, Tamaulipas, Falfurrias, Texas, New York, United States, Tijuana, San Diego, and McAllen. Much of the production has also been recorded up in Baja Estudios in Rosarito, Mexico, where films and series such as Titanic, Pearl Harbor, The Walking Dead and Pirates of the Caribbean have been filmed.

Casting 
Main cast members Carolina Miranda, Luis Ernesto Franco, Ana Lucía Domínguez, Jorge Zárate, and Gaby Espino return from previous seasons as Vicenta Acero, Daniel Phillips, La Tuti, El Indio Amaro, and Indira Cárdenas, respectively. Although Espino and Zárate are accredited in the theme of opening after the logo, the sources and accredit them as protagonists.

On July 7, 2017 the inclusion of Diego Cadavid to the main cast was confirmed.

Promotion 
The first advance of the fourth season was launched on Telemundo on 24 August 2017, during Telemundo's annual awards, where Diego Cadavid was presented for the first time as Mr. Romero, one of the new villains of the plot.  The second breakthrough was revealed in September 2017, where Blanca Soto appeared, only as a souvenir that had the character of Michel Duval, and that caused great commotion in social networks. The complete advance of the telenovela was launched on Telemundo on 17 October 2017, during the broadcast of the fifth season of El Señor de los Cielos.

Recepetion 
The first episode of the season was seen by a total of 1.77 million viewers, thus surpassing its closest competition Caer en tentación that only averages a total of 1.45 million viewers. Even so, the season did not manage to be among the most watched during his schedule of 10pm/9c, and without managing to surpass his successor El Señor de los Cielos. The final episode of the season obtained a total of 1.84 million viewers, unlike the previous seasons, its average was very low, but it remained a leader in audience in its schedule.

References 

2017 American television seasons
2018 American television seasons
2017 Mexican television seasons
Señora Acero
2018 Mexican television seasons